Macropholidus ruthveni, known commonly as Ruthven's macropholidus, is a species of lizard in the family Gymnophthalmidae. The species is endemic to northwestern South America.

Etymology
The specific name, ruthveni, is in honor of American herpetologist Alexander Grant Ruthven.

Geographic range
M. ruthveni is found in Ecuador and Peru.

Habitat

Reproduction
M. ruthveni is oviparous.

References

Further reading
Cadle JE, Chuna P (1995). "A New Lizard of the Genus Macropholidus (Teiidae) from a Relictual Humid Forest of Northwestern Peru, and Notes on Macropholidus ruthveni Noble". Breviora (501): 1-39. (in English, with an abstract in Spanish).
Noble GK (1921). "Some New Lizards from Northwestern Peru". Annals of the New York Academy of Sciences 29: 133–139. (Macropholidus ruthveni, new species).
Torres-Carvajal O, Gaona FP, Zaragoza C, Székely P (2015). "First record of Macropholidus ruthveni Noble 1921 (Squamata: Gymnophthalmidae) from Ecuador". Herpetology Notes 8: 25–26.

Macropholidus
Reptiles of Ecuador
Reptiles of Peru
Reptiles described in 1921
Taxa named by Gladwyn Kingsley Noble